Jabez Wright (25 April 1852 – 10 September 1922) was an English-born Australian politician.

Wright was born at Greenwich in England, the son of Jabez Gladstone Wright. He worked in North and South America before moving to South Australia, eventually settling in Broken Hill around 1888. On 15 January 1878 Wright had married Honora Kearney, with whom he had four children. He worked as a carpenter and then as an undertaker, and was a member of the Australian Workers' Union. From 1896 to 1902 Wright was an alderman at Broken Hill. He rose to be mayor from 1900 to 1901, the first Labor Mayor in the world. He was elected to the New South Wales Legislative Assembly in 1913 as the Labor member for Willyama. With the introduction of proportional representation in 1920 Wright was defeated running for Sturt, but filled the vacancy caused by the murder of Percy Brookfield in 1921. Wright himself caused a vacancy a year later when he died at Bondi.

References

 

1852 births
1922 deaths
Members of the New South Wales Legislative Assembly
English emigrants to Australia
People from Greenwich
Mayors of Broken Hill
People from Broken Hill, New South Wales
Australian carpenters
Australian Labor Party members of the Parliament of New South Wales